The men's singles tournament of the 2014 BWF World Championships (World Badminton Championships) took place from August 25 to 31. Lin Dan was not given wild card entry into the 2014 World Championships, as he was in 2013.

On 27 April 2015, Lee Chong Wei was stripped of his silver medal due to doping.

Seeds

  Lee Chong Wei (final)
  Chen Long (champion)
  Jan Ø. Jørgensen (third round, withdrew)
  Kenichi Tago (first round, withdrew)
  Tommy Sugiarto (semifinals)
  Wang Zhengming (quarterfinals)
  Shon Wan-ho (quarterfinals)
  Simon Santoso (first round, withdrew)

   Hu Yun (third round)
  Hans-Kristian Vittinghus (third round)
  Tian Houwei (second round)
  Boonsak Ponsana (first round, withdrew)
  Kento Momota (first round)
  Viktor Axelsen (semifinals)
  Sho Sasaki (second round)
  Chong Wei Feng (first round)

Draw

Finals

Section 1

Section 2

Section 3

Section 4

References
BWF Website

2014 BWF World Championships